Carpenter United Methodist Church is a historic Methodist church in Utica, Mississippi, United States.

It was built in 1901 and added to the National Register in 1996.

References

Churches completed in 1901
20th-century Methodist church buildings in the United States
Methodist churches in Mississippi
Churches on the National Register of Historic Places in Mississippi
1901 establishments in Mississippi
National Register of Historic Places in Copiah County, Mississippi
Carpenter Gothic church buildings in Mississippi